Blanche of France (1313 – 26 April 1358), nun at Longchamp Abbey, was the fourth and youngest daughter of King Philip V of France and Countess Joan II of Burgundy.

Blanche was born in 1313, before either of her parents ascended their respective thrones, during the reign of her paternal grandfather, King Philip IV of France. She was named after her mother's ill-fated sister, Blanche of Burgundy. A year after Blanche's birth, her mother and both paternal aunts, Blanche and Margaret of Burgundy, were implicated in the Tour de Nesle affair. The marriage of her parents was successful enough for her father to insist on her mother's acquittal, but her aunts were imprisoned.

By the time Blanche was seven years old, her parents had become king and queen of France and Navarre and count and countess palatine of Burgundy. Queen Joan decided that her youngest daughter should join the Order of Saint Francis, probably wishing that the girl's cloistered life could compensate for the sins of her imprisoned namesake aunt. Blanche's mother did not make the decision easily, however, and not before procuring several papal dispensations that would serve to alleviate the harshness of monastic life. The Queen secured a special dispensation that allowed her and the King to visit their daughter frequently, but was later cautioned by the pope against visiting Blanche too often.

Despite her religious vows, Blanche is more often mentioned as daughter of a French king by primary sources than any of her titled sisters - Countess Joan III of Burgundy, Countess Margaret I of Burgundy and Dauphine Isabella of Viennois. She is presumed to have at some point owned a richly decorated Franciscan breviary, the earliest known work of Jean Pucelle. Blanche died as a Poor Clare on 26 April 1358, outliving all her siblings except Margaret.

References 

1313 births
1358 deaths
Poor Clares
14th-century French nuns
House of Capet
French princesses
Daughters of kings